In set theory, a branch of mathematics, the condensation lemma is a result about sets in the
constructible universe.

It states that if X is a transitive set and is an elementary submodel of some level of the constructible hierarchy Lα, that is, then in fact there is some ordinal  such that .

Also, the assumption that X be transitive automatically holds when .

The lemma was formulated and proved by Kurt Gödel in his proof that the axiom of constructibility implies GCH.

References
  (theorem II.5.2 and lemma II.5.10)

Inline citations

Constructible universe
Lemmas in set theory